Fernando Antonio Álvarez Amador (born 24 August 2003) is a professional footballer who currently plays as a defender for Mexican side Pachuca. Born in the United States, he is a youth international for Colombia.

Club career
Born in New York City, United States to a Mexican father and Colombian mother, Álvarez began his career with Mexican side Pachuca. In October 2022, he went on trial with Dutch side Ajax alongside teammate Julio Pérez.

International career
Eligible to represent the United States, Mexico and Colombia, Álvarez has represented Mexico and Colombia at youth international level. He was called up to the Colombia under-20 side for the 2023 South American U-20 Championship.

Career statistics

Club

Notes

References

External links
 

2003 births
Living people
Soccer players from New York City
Colombian footballers
Colombia youth international footballers
Mexico youth international footballers
Mexican footballers
American soccer players
Colombian people of Mexican descent
Mexican people of Colombian descent
American sportspeople of Mexican descent
American sportspeople of Colombian descent
People with acquired Colombian citizenship
Citizens of Mexico through descent
Association football defenders
Liga Premier de México players
C.F. Pachuca players
Sportspeople of Mexican descent